Melanocyrillium is a Precambrian genus of vesicle-shaped (or vase-shaped) microfossils of uncertain affinity found in the Grand Canyon Supergroup and Togari Group of Tasmania. M. hexodiadema has been described as a "probable lobose amoeba".

References 

Amoebozoa genera
Fossil taxa described in 1985
Tubulinea
Precambrian fossils
Precambrian North America
Precambrian Australia